Viktor Hertzberg (born April 23, 1991) is a Swedish professional ice hockey player who is currently playing for Timrå IK in the Elitserien.

Prior to turning professional, Hertzberg played two seasons in the QMJHL.

References

External links

1991 births
Cape Breton Screaming Eagles players
Living people
Montreal Junior Hockey Club players
Swedish ice hockey right wingers